Peter Sandloff (1924–2009) was an American-born German composer of television and film scores.

Selected filmography
 Mädchen in Uniform (1958)
 We Cellar Children (1960)
 The Return of Doctor Mabuse (1961)
 Jeder stirbt für sich allein (1962)
 His Best Friend (1962)
 Life Begins at Eight (1962)
 The Lightship (1963)

References

Bibliography 
 Bergfelder, Tim. International Adventures: German Popular Cinema and European Co-Productions in the 1960s. Berghahn Books, 2005.

External links 
 

1924 births
2009 deaths
German composers
People from New York City
American emigrants to Germany